Guemps is a commune in the Pas-de-Calais department in the Hauts-de-France region of France.

Geography
A farming village situated 5 miles (8 km) southeast of Calais, at the D229 and D32 crossroads.

Population

Places of interest
 The church of St.John the Baptist, dating from the fifteenth century.
 The windmills, used to pump water from the marshland.

See also
Communes of the Pas-de-Calais department

References

Communes of Pas-de-Calais
Pale of Calais